Julius Caesar Against the Pirates is a 1962 Italian adventure film written and directed  by Sergio Grieco and starring Gustavo Rojo, Abbe Lane and Gordon Mitchell.  It is loosely based on actual events from the early life of Julius Caesar.

Plot
It's 75 BC and Rome is in turmoil. Killers are on the loose. The dictator Lucius Cornelius Sulla Felix is having all the Roman Senators
who refuse to support him murdered.
Julius Caesar must flee due to his wife's Cornelia family's ties to Sulla's enemies.  Caesar decides to flee Rome to the court of his friend, King Nicomedes of Bithynia.  While traveling to Mileto, Caesar is captured by pirates and taken to their island fortress on the island of Formacusa.  The pirates led by Hamar are engaged in hostilities with Bithynia, and Caesar swears that once he has paid his ransom of fifty talents of gold, he will return and destroy the pirates.

Cast

 Gustavo Rojo as Julius Caesar
 Abbe Lane as Plauzia
 Gordon Mitchell as Hamar
 Erno Crisa as Sulla
  Rossana Fattori as Eber
 Piero Lulli as Edom
  Franca Parisi as Cornelia
 Silvana Jachino as Quintilia
 Massimo Carocci as Publius
 Ignazio Leone as Frontone
  Fedele Gentile as Valerio Torquato, Governor of Mileto 
  Pasquale Basile as Tullius
 Antonio Basile as Glaucus
  Aldo Cecconi as Akim
 Mario Petri as Nicomedes
 Antonio Gradoli as Lucius
 Nando Angelini as Roman Official

Production
Julius Caesar Against the Pirates was shot at INCOM studios in Rome with sea battle scenes filmed in Yugoslavia.

Release
Julius Caesar Against the Pirates was released in Italy on April 23, 1962.

References

Footnotes

Sources

External links

1962 adventure films
1960s biographical films
Italian biographical films
Peplum films
Films directed by Sergio Grieco
Films about Julius Caesar
Pirate films
Films set in the Mediterranean Sea
Sword and sandal films
Cultural depictions of Cornelia (wife of Caesar)
1960s Italian films